Lilly Helene Steinschneider-Wenckheim (13 January 1891 – 28 March 1975), more commonly known as Lilly Steinschneider, was the first Hungarian woman to qualify as a pilot.

Early life
Lilly Steinschneider was born in Budapest on 13 January 1891, the second child of  Irma Wohr and Bernát Steinschneider, a wealthy Austrian-Hungarian-Jewish family. Her father owned of a quilt factory which provided quilt covers for the House of Habsburg in Austria, and her mother had Czech origins. Lilly was the second child born in the Steinschneider family, with an older brother called Hugó. Little is known about the first eighteen years of her life.

Flying career
She learned to fly from flying instructor Karl Illner in Wiener Neustadt in August 1912. She was the first Hungarian woman and second woman from the Austro-Hungarian empire to qualify as a pilot (the first was aviator Božena Laglerová). Steinschneider received pilot's license number four in Hungary. She flew an Etrich Taube. On 6 October 1912 she took part in the air show held at Nagyvárad. She caused a stir as a woman at the flight meeting at Aspern airfield in 1913. The French woman pilot Jeanne Pallier also flew that day and the two women placed third and fourth in the duration contest.

Marriage and later life

In 1914, she married , of the Coudenhove-Kalergi family, son of Heinrich von Coudenhove-Kalergi and Mitsuko Aoyama, and older brother of Richard von Coudenhove-Kalergi.

After her marriage, she stopped flying and lived with her husband in Ronsperg Castle in Bohemia area of the Czech Republic.

In 1927 she gave birth to her daughter, Maria Electa Thecla Elisabeth Christina Helena Sophia Coudenhove-Kalergi, known as Marina. In 1939 she and her daughter moved to Italy from the Czech Republic to avoid Nazi persecution for her Jewish heritage.

She died on 28 March 1975 in Geneva.

Commemoration
Lilly-Steinschneider-Gasse in Wiener Neustadt in Austria was named in her honour.

The writer Bernhard Setzwein describes her life and marriage to Johann Graf Coudenhove-Kalergi in his novel The Bohemian Samurai, published in 2017.

References

External links

Biography and photos

Aviation pioneers
Women aviators
Hungarian aviators
Lilly
Nobility from Budapest
Hungarian expatriates in Switzerland
Hungarian people of Czech descent
People from Wiener Neustadt
1891 births
1975 deaths